S.S. Memorial Senior Secondary Public School, Saifai is a co-educational day senior secondary school in  Saifai, Etawah, Uttar Pradesh, India. It is affiliated to the Central Board of Secondary Education (CBSE).

See also
 S.S. Memorial Educational Academy, Saifai
 Uttar Pradesh University of Medical Sciences, Saifai
 Chaudhary Charan Singh Post Graduate College, Heonra-Saifai
 Saifai Sports College, Saifai

References

External links

High schools and secondary schools in Uttar Pradesh
Private schools in Uttar Pradesh
CBSE Delhi
Saifai
Educational institutions established in 1995
1995 establishments in Uttar Pradesh